Westlake Lake is a 125 acre artificial lake with 8 miles of shoreline in Westlake Village, California. It was built in 1969. Over 1,300 houses are located either on or within access of the lake. A number of houses are located on an island inside the lake that is connected by La Venta Drive. The lake is stocked with bass but fishing and boating is restricted to Westlake Village residents with guests and permits. The lake is the namesake of Westlake Village, where it is located. The lake also has its own yacht club, Westlake Yacht Club, which teaches people of all ages how to sail in the lake. At the end of the lake there is a rabbit sculpture named Cottonsail. It is one of 17 similar sculptures around Conejo Valley. Orange mussels live in the lake and taking them is restricted. Westlake Lake is one of the largest lakes in Thousand Oaks.

References
https://www.conejovalleyguide.com/dosomethingblog/westlake-lake-in-westlake-village.html

External links
 https://www.tripadvisor.com/LocationPhotoDirectLink-g33258-i1909298-Westlake_Village_California.html

1969 establishments in California
Artificial lakes of the United States
Lakes of California
Westlake Village, California